Andy Phillips (born July 31, 1991) is an American football center who is currently a free agent. He played college football at Central Michigan.

Early years
Phillips attended Waverly Senior High School in his hometown Lansing, Michigan. He was a four-year starter and finished his career with 510 tackles, and was a four-time all-conference selection.

College career
Phillips redshirted his first year (2010) at Central Michigan University. In 2011, he started the final five games of the season at center. For the three subsequent years, he started every game at left guard, racking up a team-high 43 consecutive starts.

Professional career

On May 11, 2015, Phillips was signed as an undrafted free agent by the Green Bay Packers, after participating in their rookie orientation camp on a tryout basis. Reportedly, he worked exclusively at center during the open portions of the camp.

References

External links
CMU Chippewas bio 

1991 births
Living people
Sportspeople from Lansing, Michigan
Players of American football from Michigan
Central Michigan Chippewas football players
Green Bay Packers players